Chandigarh Golf Club is a Non Profit Charitable Registered golf club in Chandigarh, India. It has a 7,202 yard, 18 hole course known for its  challenging narrow fairways, a long 613 yard long, dogleg 7th hole, and floodlighting on the first nine holes. The course was designed by 4-time Open Championship winner, Peter Thomson (golfer).

The club has been home to some fine professional golfers, the most noted being Jeev Milkha Singh.

The club has a fine clubhouse, a swimming pool and a gymnasium for its 2,300 members. Membership is notoriously difficult to get, with waiting periods running into tens of years.
The club has 1,000 NRI members who paid $3,000 initiation Fees and yearly dues, with a total of $300,000 Thousand Dollars -USD., Approx. Rs. 24Crore rupees, NRI members do not have any Voting Rights, even Though GOI has allowed Dual Citizenship and Voting Rights to NRI's.

Course
It has a 7,202 yard, 18 hole course known for its challenging narrow fairways, a long 613 yard long, dogleg 7th hole, floodlighting on the first nine holes, and a main road crossing.

Facilities
The club has a clubhouse, swimming pool, and a gymnasium for its 2,300 members.

Other similar attractions
 Hisar Army Golf Course at Hisar Military Station
 Hisar Police Lines Golf Course at Hisar

See also

 List of Golf Courses in India
 List of national parks of India
 Wildlife sanctuaries of India

References 

Golf clubs and courses in India
Sport in Haryana
Sport in Chandigarh
Sports venues in Chandigarh
1962 establishments in East Punjab
Sports venues completed in 1962
20th-century architecture in India